Aakash, or Ubislate 7, is a series of low-cost tablet computers produced by DataWind, all of which use the Android operating system.

Datawind 

DataWind is a British company that produce wireless web access products, and is the makers of Ubisurfer and pocketsurfer. The company was found in 2001 by brothers Suneet and Raja Singh Tuli, originally from Punjab. The company has offices in India, U.S. and Canada. It was contracted to make cheap tablet computers for students in India by the Ministry of Human Resource Development; it also sold them publicly as "Ubislate 7", but did not meet demand, so was criticized in the media. By May 2013, it had shipped all the pre-orders dating back to December 2011.

Models 

The Ubislate 7 series includes the following models:

 Ubislate 7
 Ubislate 7+
 Ubislate 7Ri
 Ubislate 7R+
 Ubislate 7Ci
 Ubislate 7C+
 Ubislate 7CZ (announced)

Variants 

All the tablets in the series are categorized as follows:

Hardware 
The Ubislate 7 Series Tablet has a seven-inch touchscreen with 800×480 pixel resolution  and uses Cortex A8 800Mhz processor (256 MB RAM) while the others have Cortex A8 1 GHz processor with 512 MB RAM. The initial model had 2 full size USB ports while in the final models they were reduced to a single Micro USB port. The Ubislate 7+ had 2 GB flash memory while the final models have 4 GB flash memory. All of the models support MicroSD Cards, up to 32 GB. The final models also features a G-Sensor for maintaining orientation. Like other Android devices these have no physical buttons except a Home screen button, power button and volume rocker. The final models also has a front facing VGA Camera. The tablets use a proprietary power connector.

Software 
The Ubislate 7+ runs on Android 2.2 Froyo while an update to 2.3 Gingerbread is available. All other models run on Android 4.0.3 Ice Cream Sandwich. The tablets have a customized version of the operating system, which includes:

Google Search in top left corner of homescreen
Workspace Effect Settings, next to google search
Volume Controls on the bottom,
Pre installed Apps include- App Killer, UbiInfo, Ubimail, Internet Ubisurfer etc.
The Ubislate 7+ has access to Getjar app store while others has complete access to Google Playstore.

References 

Android (operating system) devices
Tablet computers